Ferdinand Chi Fon (born July 20, 1976, in Bamenda) is a retired Cameroonian footballer. He has played in Poland for 15 years.

External links
 

1976 births
Living people
Cameroonian footballers
Cameroonian expatriate footballers
Górnik Łęczna players
Flota Świnoujście players
GKS Bełchatów players
Pogoń Szczecin players
Znicz Pruszków players
GKS Katowice players
1. FC Union Berlin players
Odra Opole players
Expatriate footballers in Germany
Expatriate footballers in Poland
Cameroonian expatriate sportspeople in Germany
Cameroonian expatriate sportspeople in Poland
People from Bamenda
Association football forwards